Valeria y Maximiliano is a Mexican telenovela produced by Carlos Sotomayor for Televisa in 1991.

Leticia Calderón and Juan Ferrara starred as protagonists, while Ana Colchero and Marco Muñoz starred as antagonists.

Synopsis
This is the story of Valeria the most beautiful daughter of Miguel and Blanca Landero. Her beauty leads to jealousy and destruction while her strength helps her overcome all her family's troubles. Valeria rejects many men but the worst of which is Roman de la Fuente who destroys her family after she rejects him. Luckily Valeria is not alone Maximiliano(who is in love with her) always lends a shoulder to cry on.

Cast 

Main
 Leticia Calderón as Valeria Landero de Franco de Riva
 Juan Ferrara as Maximiliano Riva
 Marco Muñoz as Román de la Fuente
 Arturo Peniche as Patricio del Val
 Ana Colchero as Susana Landero
 Cecilia Gabriela as Dulce Landero

Supporting
 Magda Karina as Nydia Ramos
 Gina Romand as Mercedes Ramos
 Rubén Rojo as Julio Souberville
 Rosita Arenas as Blanca Landero
 Claudio Obregón as Ernesto Ramos
 Carlos Bracho as Miguel Landero
 Magda Guzmán as Eugenia Landero "Mamá U"
 Eugenia Avendaño as Aunt Nena
 Juan Carlos Muñoz as Salvador Becerril
 Daniela Durán as Lucy Mora
 Héctor Parra as Dr. José Sánchez
 Hugo Acosta as Alberto de la Garza
 Luis Uribe as Captain Manuel Nava
 Ricardo Leal as Oficial Noriega
 Jorge Salinas as Damián Souberville
 Israel Jaitovich as Juan Pablo Souberville
 Guillermo Quintanilla as Matías
 Humberto Yáñez as Jiménez
 Cuca Dublán as Tomasa
 Rubén Camelo as Toño
 Tere Rábago as Benita
 Vivian Gray as Angélica Corso
 Georgina Pedret as Verónica
 Guadalupe Bolaños as Lety
 José María Negri as Fausto
 Graciela Bernardos as Psychiatrist

Awards and nominations

References

External links

1991 telenovelas
Mexican telenovelas
1991 Mexican television series debuts
1992 Mexican television series endings
Spanish-language telenovelas
Television shows set in Mexico City
Television shows set in Guadalajara
Television shows set in New York City
Televisa telenovelas